Official Live: 101 Proof is a live album by American heavy metal band Pantera, released on July 29, 1997.

Content
The first 14 tracks are live recordings of songs from previously released studio albums, starting with Cowboys from Hell. The last two songs ("Where You Come From" and "I Can't Hide") are new studio recordings.

Drummer Vinnie Paul stated:
"We recorded the new material during a break in our tour. We recorded them in 12 days. It was a great feeling to get back in the studio again. Especially when we knew the songs were going to go on an album that is so important for us and our fans.

We felt like after 7 years of playing live, that we wanted to put out a record with all our best tunes. Songs that have our own TLC instead of all that foolishness that happens when a band puts out a greatest hits album or some overdubbed live album."

The track "Dom/Hollow" is an amalgamation of parts of "Domination" (originally from Cowboys from Hell) and "Hollow" (originally from Vulgar Display of Power). The band played "Domination" leading into "Hollow" virtually every time they played either song live.

The track "Hostile" is simply a live version of "Fucking Hostile" (from Vulgar Display of Power) with a shortened title.

During the song "Becoming", the band would end the song with the outro of "Throes of Rejection" from their album Far Beyond Driven. Likewise, the band ended "I'm Broken" with the outro of "By Demons Be Driven" from the album Vulgar Display of Power.

Artwork
The album cover is a visual reference to the "Jack Daniel's Tennessee Whiskey" bottle label, with "101 Proof" referring to alcohol content the same as that of "Wild Turkey Bourbon" and "No. 5" again referring to the brand (like Jack Daniel's Old No. 7 brand), and the fact that the band considered this their fifth "official" release (starting with Cowboys from Hell and not counting their four earlier independent albums).

Release and reception

Official Live: 101 Proof reached number 15 on the Billboard 200 chart with the album receiving solid reviews, and stayed on the chart up to 12 weeks.

Track listing

Personnel
Phil Anselmo – lead vocals
Dimebag Darrell – guitar, backing vocals, production
Rex Brown – bass, backing vocals
Vinnie Paul – drums, production

Charts

Certifications

References

1997 live albums
East West Records live albums
Pantera albums